Walter Forde (born Thomas Seymour Woolford, 21 April 1898 – 7 January 1984) was a British actor, screenwriter and director. Born in Lambeth, south London in 1898, he directed over fifty films between 1919 from the silent era through to 1949 in the sound era. He died in Los Angeles, California in 1984.

Forde was the son of the music hall comedian Tom Seymour. During the 1920s, he was a silent film comedian, acting in a series of shorts before shifting into directing feature films. Emerging as an established film director in the 1930s, he directed films for Gainsborough Pictures and Ealing Studios.

Filmography

Actor
Walter Finds a Father, extant
Walter Wants Work, extant in the Huntley Archives
Walter's Day Out

Actor
Walter The Sleuth 1926,

Director

 What Next? (1928)
 Wait and See (1929)
 The Silent House (1929)
 Would You Believe It? (1929)
 Red Pearls (1930)
 Bed and Breakfast (1930)
 Lord Richard in the Pantry (1930)
 The Last Hour (1930)
 You'd Be Surprised! (1930)
 Third Time Lucky (1931)
 The Ringer (1931)
 Splinters in the Navy (1931)
 The Ghost Train (1931)
 Condemned to Death (1932)
 Lord Babs (1932)
 Jack's the Boy (1932)
 Rome Express (1932)
 Orders Is Orders (1933)
 Jack Ahoy (1934)
 Chu Chin Chow (1934)
 Bulldog Jack (1935)
 Forever England (1935)
 King of the Damned (1935)
 Land Without Music (1936)
 Kicking the Moon Around (1938)
 The Gaunt Stranger (1938)
 Let's Be Famous (1939)
 The Four Just Men (1939)
 Cheer Boys Cheer (1939)
 Inspector Hornleigh on Holiday (1939)
 Saloon Bar (1940)
 Sailors Three (1940)
 Charley's (Big-Hearted) Aunt (1940)
 Atlantic Ferry (1941)
 The Ghost Train (1941)
 Inspector Hornleigh Goes to It (1941)
 Go to Blazes (1942, short)
 The Peterville Diamond (1942)
 Flying Fortress (1942)
 It's That Man Again (1943)
 Time Flies (1944)
 One Exciting Night (1944)
 Master of Bankdam (1947)
 Cardboard Cavalier (1949)

References

Bibliography
 Hunter, I.Q. & Porter, Laraine. British Comedy Cinema. Routledge, 2012.

External links
 
Walter Forde at BFI Screenonline

1898 births
1984 deaths
English film directors
English male silent film actors
Male actors from Bradford
English male film actors
20th-century English male actors
Film people from Yorkshire